Sokołówka may refer to the following places in Poland:
Sokołówka, Lublin Voivodeship (east Poland)
Sokołówka, Łódź Voivodeship (central Poland)
Sokołówka, Otwock County in Masovian Voivodeship (east-central Poland)
Sokołówka, Kalisz County in Greater Poland Voivodeship (west-central Poland)
Sokołówka, Krotoszyn County in Greater Poland Voivodeship (west-central Poland)